Skoal may refer to:
 skoal! or skål!, a Scandinavian phrase used as a toast.
 Skoal (tobacco), a smokeless tobacco brand made by U.S. Smokeless Tobacco Company

See also
Fire and Skoal, senior society at Dartmouth College
 Skol (disambiguation)
 Skal (disambiguation)
 Skoll (disambiguation)